United American Free Will Baptist Conference, Inc. is the smaller of the two African-American Free Will Baptist conferences in the United States.

History

Prior to emancipation, black slaves and Free blacks were members of predominantly white  Free Will Baptist congregations in the United States. The first black Free Will Baptist minister was Robert Tash, ordained in 1827. African-Americans organized their first separate congregation in 1867 at Snow Hill in Greene County, North Carolina, the first annual conference in 1870, and the first association in 1887. The General Conference of United Free Will Baptists was formed in 1901. The United American Free Will Baptist Conference, Incorporated, was created in 1968 under the leadership of O. L. Williams of Lakeland, Florida, resulting from a division in the parent United American Free Will Baptist Church.<ref>'Dictionary of Baptists in America, Leonard, p. 273</ref> 

In 2007 the United American Free Will Baptist Conference had seventy-five congregations with approximately 11,200 members, mostly in Florida, but also in South Carolina, Louisiana, and Arkansas. In addition to the annual meeting of the General Conference, there are six regional conferences that meet annually: South Carolina Annual Conference, Louisiana/Arkansas Annual Conference, East Florida Annual Conference, West Florida Annual Conference, South Florida "A" Annual Conference, and South Florida "B" Annual Conference. UAFW Baptist Church headquarters are located in Lakeland, Florida, and Henry J. Rodmon currently serves as General Bishop.

References

SourcesBaptists Around the World, by Albert W. Wardin, Jr., 1995Dictionary of Baptists in America, Bill J. Leonard, editor, 1994International Circle of Faith Colleges and SeminariesThe Twelve Tribe of Baptists in the USA'', by Albert W. Wardin, Jr., 2007

External links
United American Free Will Baptist Conference, Inc.
Snow Hill, NC Official Town Website
United American Free Will Baptist Bible College

Free Will Baptists
Lakeland, Florida
Christian organizations established in 1968
Baptist denominations in the United States
Historically African-American Christian denominations
Baptist denominations established in the 20th century